Francis Chouler is a South African actor from Cape Town. He trained in acting at University of Cape Town, graduating cum laude with a BA in Theatre and Performance in 2010. His first leading role was in the Bollywood film, Crook. In 2016, he played Jack Cleary in the film Eye in the Sky as well as appearing in the Netflix series The Crown. Chouler is an executive member of South African Guild of Actors.

Filmography

References

External links

Interview, Cape Times October 2011
Cape Times review of Mary and the Conqueror, October 2011
Sunday Independent review of Mary and the Conqueror, October 2011
Interview in The Callsheet for Crook May 2010
Cast of Judge Dredd Movie
Press release for The Birds December 2011

Living people
South African male film actors
University of Cape Town alumni
Year of birth missing (living people)